Şevket Çoruh (born June 30, 1973) is a Turkish actor. His maternal family is of Laz and Georgian descents. After Russo-Turkish War (1877–1878), his maternal family immigrated to Sapanca. His paternal family is from Anaçlı, Ardanuç. 

He is best known for the 16 season long police series Arka Sokaklar and the film franchises Çakallarla Dans and İnşaat. His other roles are in popular projects such as Anlat İstanbul, Gönül, Yılan Hikayesi, Çiçek Taksi, and Sultan Makamı. He graduated from Müjdat Gezen Art Center, which is one of the biggest private Turkish dance and theater education institutions. He founded theatre "Baba Sahne".

Filmography

References

External links
 Şevket Çoruh - SinemaTürk 2.0
 Mağara Adamı - Şevket Çoruh

1973 births
Living people
Male actors from Istanbul
Turkish male television actors
Turkish male film actors